Patricia Kingori is a British Kenyan sociologist who is a professor at the University of Oxford. Her research considers the experiences of frontline health workers around the world. She is particularly interested in misinformation and pseudoscience. In 2015, Kingori was included on the Powerlist.

Early life and education 
Kingori was born in Kenya. As a child she moved to Saint Kitts in the Caribbean. She stayed in the Caribbean until she was a teenager, when she moved to London. Kingori was an undergraduate student at the Royal Holloway, University of London, where she studied sociology. After graduating she worked as a research assistant in the University of London. Kingori focussed her doctoral research on the ethical challenges experienced by frontline workers. After initially struggling to secure funding, Kingori was awarded a Wellcome Doctoral Studentship and began her PhD at the London School of Hygiene & Tropical Medicine. She was supervised by Catherine Dodds and Judith Green. After completing her doctoral research, Kingori moved to the multidisciplinary bioethics Ethox Centre at the University of Oxford where she continued studying the lives of frontline workers, comparing their experiences in The Gambia, Cambodia and Uganda.
In December 2021, Kingori became the youngest black Oxbridge professor and the youngest woman to ever be awarded a full professorship at the University of Oxford. She is Professor of Global Health Ethics at the Nuffield Department of Population Health, Wellcome Senior Investigator, and Senior Research Fellow at Somerville College.

Research and career 
Kingori was appointed to the faculty at the Ethox Centre shortly after completing her first postdoctoral position. Her research considers the sociology of science and medicine. She is particularly interested in the experiences and values of frontline staff, for example, those conducting clinical trials and treatment in Africa. Kingori has studied the origins and spread of pseudoscience and misinformation in global health. She presented her work on "fakes and facts" in a pandemic at the Science Gallery.

In 2021, Kingori became the youngest woman to be made a Full Professor at the University of Oxford.

Academic service 
Kingori serves on the board of the Global Health Bioethics Network, the management team of the Wellcome Centre for Ethics and Humanities and the Development Board of the Black Cultural Archives. At Oxford, Kingori is part of the Central University Research Ethics Committee. Kingori has appeared on Julia Gillard's podcast A Podcast of One's Own. She is a member of the Scientific Advisory Group for Emergencies Scientific Pandemic Insights Group on Behaviours, SAGE SPI-B, which is overseen by Ann John and Brooke Rogers, and provides information on how to help people adhere to interventions during global challenges such as the COVID-19 pandemic. She is a member of the COVID-19 Clinical Research Coalition.

Selected publications

Personal life 
Kingori's sister, Vanessa Kingori, is publishing director of British Vogue.

References 

Living people
Alumni of Royal Holloway, University of London
British women sociologists
Alumni of the London School of Hygiene & Tropical Medicine
Fellows of Somerville College, Oxford
Kenyan scientists
Year of birth missing (living people)